Jurczyce may refer to the following places in Poland:
Jurczyce, Lesser Poland Voivodeship (south Poland)
Jurczyce, Wrocław County in Lower Silesian Voivodeship (south-west Poland)